The 2007 FedEx Orange Bowl game was a college football Bowl Championship Series (BCS) bowl game following the 2006 NCAA Division I FBS football season. The game was played on January 2, 2007, at Dolphin Stadium in Miami Gardens, Florida.  The game matched the No. 6 Louisville Cardinals versus the No. 15 Wake Forest Demon Deacons and was televised on Fox.

Each of the teams selected an honorary captain. Louisville chose boxing legend Muhammad Ali, a Louisville native, and Wake Forest chose golf great Arnold Palmer, a Wake alumnus. Dwyane Wade of the hometown Miami Heat presented the coin for the coin toss.

The officiating team was provided by the Southeastern Conference.

Scoring summary

References

Orange Bowl
Orange Bowl
Louisville Cardinals football bowl games
Wake Forest Demon Deacons football bowl games
Orange Bowl
January 2007 sports events in the United States